The fifteenth and final series of the British television music competition The X Factor began airing on ITV on 1 September 2018, presented by Dermot O'Leary. Simon Cowell returned alongside new judges Louis Tomlinson, Ayda Field (credited as Ayda Williams), and Robbie Williams who replace departing judges Nicole Scherzinger, Sharon Osbourne, and Louis Walsh. Nile Rodgers filled in for Williams while he was away on his tour for weeks 3–5 of the live shows. On 2 December, Jamaican-born singer Dalton Harris won the series making him the first and only foreign contender to win the UK show. This was the only series that featured Tomlinson, Field, and Williams as judges.

Judges and presenters 

On 6 June 2018, it was announced that Sharon Osbourne would return to judge the fifteenth series, but only for the live shows, due to her ongoing work commitments in the United States. The next day, long-serving judge Louis Walsh announced that after thirteen years on the show, he would leave to focus on other projects. Earlier in the year, it was reported that Nicole Scherzinger would not return as a judge for the fifteenth series.

On 30 September 2018, Osbourne announced her decision to no longer appear as a judge during the live shows, stating that she had "seen the new judges finding their rhythm and are doing brilliantly".

Simon Cowell confirmed his return as head judge and Dermot O'Leary’s return as presenter. After much speculation, it was announced on 16 July 2018 that Ayda Field (credited as Ayda Williams), Louis Tomlinson, and Robbie Williams would join Cowell on the series' judging panel to replace Osbourne, Scherzinger, and Walsh.

On 23 August 2018, it was announced that Xtra Bites would return after a first series, presented by Becca Dudley again, and she would be joined by a co-host named Tinea Taylor.

On 2 November 2018, it was revealed that Nile Rodgers would fill in for Williams on the panel during some of the live shows, due to Williams' touring commitments. Rodgers sat alongside Williams on 3 November, before fully substituting for him on 4, 10, 11 & 17 November. In a statement, Rodgers stated: "I had such a great time with Louis at the Judge's House in Ibiza a couple of weeks ago that when the opportunity came to step in for Robbie I could not say ('no')", "From Chic and Sister Sledge to Duran Duran and Daft Punk, I've had great experiences with Groups in my career, so I look forward to giving them as much support as I can while Rob is away!". Williams returned to the panel on 24 November.

Selection process

Auditions 
Auditions for performers took place only at London's SSE Arena, Wembley, on 18–20, 22–24 and 26–28 July 2018.

Deliberations
Instead of the traditional bootcamp stages, a deliberation stage (similar to that employed by Britain's Got Talent) was introduced to cut down the number of performers at the six-chair challenge. This took place on 30 July 2018 at the Tobacco Dock in London. It was broadcast on a single episode on 23 September 2018 after the final auditions show.

After the "deliberation" and "reveal" stages, but before the start of the "six-chair challenge", the judges found out the categories they are mentoring: Cowell mentored the "Girls", Field mentored the "Over 29s", Williams mentored the "Groups", and Tomlinson mentored the "Boys".

Six Chair Challenge
The Six Chair Challenge took place over the course of three days, from 1–3 August 2018, at the SSE Arena in Wembley. A new twist was added with the introduction of a golden button, similar to Got Talents Golden Buzzer.  When this was pressed, the act in question was guaranteed a 'Safe Seat', and would go straight through to Judges' Houses. The Six Chair Challenge was aired over 3 episodes starting on 29 September 2018 and finished on 6 October 2018.

Judges' Houses 
It was announced by O'Leary during an appearance on This Morning that the Judges' Houses would be filmed in late September 2018, and that three of the judges' houses would be in Los Angeles (Cowell, Field and Williams); Tomlinson's houses would be hosted in Ibiza. Cowell judged from Malibu, while Field and Williams each judged their categories separately from their home in Beverly Hills. The guest judges were announced to be including American Idol alumnus Adam Lambert and Series 3 winner Leona Lewis in assisting Field, David Walliams with Williams, and Cowell's American Idol colleagues Paula Abdul, Randy Jackson and Ryan Seacrest along with Diane Warren, Babyface, Lewis and Sinitta to assist Cowell, who hosted a house party consisting of various singers, songwriters and record producers for the Girls to perform in front of. Tomlinson was assisted by his One Direction bandmate Liam Payne and Nile Rodgers.

Maria Laroco was not able to secure the correct visa in time to travel to Malibu with the remaining Girls for this stage of the competition. Unlike similar instances where the affected contestants withdrew from the competition, Laroco sang to Cowell via video link from a London studio.

16 contestants were put through to the live shows at this stage, four from each category. This last-minute change was lobbied by Cowell who was unable to narrow his Girls down to just three; the other judges were then allowed one more act each for their own categories as well.

Acts 

Key:
 – Winner
 – Runner-Up
 – Golden Buzzer/Safe Seat (Six-Chair Challenge)

Live shows
The contestants were announced after each category performed at Judges' Houses. There were 16 contestants (4 from each category) this year. The Live Shows were broadcast for 7 weeks from 20 October to 2 December. This year the live shows reverted to the previous format of all performances on the Saturday night and the results show on the Sunday night. However, there are 16 finalists and a reduced number of live shows, so almost all of the live result shows had double eliminations.

Nile Rodgers temporarily replaced Williams on the panel, due to touring commitments. Rodgers appeared in Williams's place from 4–18 November.

For the first time since 2008, there was no elimination on the Saturday (1 December 2018). Instead, all 3 finalists progressed the Sunday (2 December 2018) live final results show.

Musical guests
Keala Settle and Rak-Su, the winners of the previous series, performed on the first live results show. Little Mix and Kylie Minogue performed on the second live results show. James Arthur and Jonas Blue, Liam Payne and Lennon Stella performed on the third live results show. Michael Bublé, Olly Murs and Lady Leshurr performed on the fourth live results show. Cheryl and Tom Walker performed on the fifth live results show. Benny Andersson and Björn Ulvaeus appeared on the sixth live show (Andersson doing a Masterclass with the semi-finalists and Ulvaeus appearing on the judging panel alongside Williams, Field, Tomlinson and Cowell to judge the performances). Zara Larsson performed on the sixth live results show. The live final featured a performance from Robbie Williams (with Take That) on the live final results show.

Final venue 
Unlike the previous series where the live final was held at The ExCeL Center in London, instead this year's final was held at the normal venue which is The SSE Arena, Wembley in London.

Winners single 
The winners single was the winning contestant's duet from the Sunday (2 December 2018) result show with all proceeds going to the children's charities Together for Short Lives and Shooting Star Chase. It is the eighth year running that the Chancellor of the Exchequer has waived any VAT on The X Factor's winners single. The winner was announced to be Dalton Harris who performed a duet with James Arthur on "The Power of Love".

Results summary

Colour key
 Act in team Louis 

 Act in team Simon

 Act in team Robbie

 Act in team Ayda

Live show details

Week 1 (20/21 October)
 Theme: This is Me
 Musical guests: Keala Settle ("This Is Me") and Rak-Su ("I Want You to Freak")

This week's results show featured a double elimination. The three acts with the fewest votes were announced as the bottom three, and the act out of the three with the fewest public votes was then automatically eliminated. The remaining two acts then performed in the final showdown for the judges' votes.

Judges' votes to eliminate
 Field: Armstrong Martins – backed her own act, Janice Robinson, saying she deserves to be in the competition.
 Tomlinson: Janice Robinson – backed his own act, Armstrong Martins.
 Williams: Armstrong Martins – gave no reason but many fans accused Williams of backing his wife's act.
 Cowell: Armstrong Martins – said that despite Martins being more interesting, Robinson was the better singer.

Week 2 (27/28 October)
 Theme: Guilty Pleasures
 Musical guests: Little Mix ("Woman Like Me") and Kylie Minogue ("A Lifetime to Repair")

This week's results show featured a double elimination. Lines were frozen on Sunday at 7:30 pm, 30 minutes before the results show, and Janice Robinson was eliminated after the special guest performance from Little Mix after receiving the fewest votes. Lines then reopened and the two acts with the next fewest votes then performed in the sing-off.

Judges' votes to eliminate
 Williams: Brendan Murray – backed his own act, LMA Choir.
 Tomlinson: LMA Choir – backed his own act, Brendan Murray.
 Cowell: Brendan Murray – gave no reason.
 Field: LMA Choir – could not decide so chose to take the vote to deadlock.

With the acts in the sing-off receiving two votes each, the result went to deadlock and reverted to the earlier public vote. LMA Choir were eliminated as the act with the fewest public votes.

Week 3 (3/4 November)
 Theme: Fright Night
 Musical guests: James Arthur ("Empty Space") and Jonas Blue, Liam Payne & Lennon Stella ("Polaroid")

The live show was pre-recorded during Saturday afternoon to allow Williams to be present before flying to South America for touring commitments. Nile Rodgers appeared as a guest judge, filling in for Williams during the third results show and the fourth & fifth live shows and results shows.

This week's results show featured a double elimination. Lines were originally scheduled to be frozen on Sunday at 7:30 pm, 60 minutes before the results show, the act receiving the fewest votes leaving the competition at the beginning of the show before lines would reopen and the two acts with the next fewest votes would then perform in the sing-off. However, due to a technical issue that affected the sound during Danny Tetley and Anthony Russell's performances, Saturday's public vote was cancelled and lines instead opened in the results show on Sunday. At the start of the live results show, all of the performances were shown in full before the public vote opened for 14 minutes.

 
Judges' votes to eliminate
 Rodgers: Molly Scott – based on the sing-off performances, effectively backing Williams' own act, Acacia & Aaliyah.
 Cowell: Acacia & Aaliyah – backed his own act, Molly Scott.
 Field: Molly Scott – based on the sing-off performances.
 Tomlinson: Molly Scott – said both acts have potential but he was not sure Scott was "quite there yet".

Week 4 (10/11 November)
 Theme: "Movies" (songs from films)
 Musical guests: Michael Bublé ("When I Fall in Love") and Olly Murs featuring Lady Leshurr ("Moves")

This week's results show featured a double elimination. Lines were frozen on Sunday at 7:30 pm, 60 minutes before the results show, and Misunderstood were eliminated after the special guest performance from Bublé after receiving the fewest votes. Lines then reopened and the two acts with the next fewest votes then performed in the sing-off.

Judges' votes to eliminate
 Rodgers: Giovanni Spano – backed Williams' own act, Acacia & Aaliyah.
 Field: Acacia & Aaliyah – backed her own act, Giovanni Spano, saying he brought fun and vital entertainment to the competition.
 Tomlinson: Giovanni Spano – believed Acacia & Aaliyah had a future as recording artists while Spano had more of a future in musical theatre.
 Cowell: Giovanni Spano – gave no specific reason but praised both acts' sing-off performances.

Week 5: Quarter-Final (17/18 November)
 Theme: Big Band
 Musical guests: Tom Walker ("Leave a Light On") and Cheryl ("Love Made Me Do It")

This week's results show featured a double elimination. Lines were frozen on Sunday at 7:30 pm, 30 minutes before the results show, and Bella Penfold was eliminated immediately at the beginning of the show. Once that occurred, lines reopened for a few more minutes and the two acts with the next fewest votes performed in the sing off.

During the results show, Cowell originally told the acts that the final six would go on The X Factor Live Tour in 2019. After the elimination of Shan Ako, Cowell stated that he would allow both her and Penfold to join the final six on tour as well. His statement meant that the final eight would perform on the tour rather than the final six.

Judges' votes to eliminate
 Cowell: Acacia & Aaliyah – backed his own act, Shan Ako.
 Rodgers: Shan Ako – backed Williams' own act, Acacia & Aaliyah.
 Tomlinson: Acacia & Aaliyah – based on "vocal ability" without being led by his emotions.
 Field: Shan Ako – praised both acts' sing-off performances but could not decide so chose to take the vote to deadlock, though fans accused Field of not wanting her husband to return without an act in the competition.

With the acts in the sing-off receiving two votes each, the result went to deadlock and reverted to the earlier public vote. Shan Ako was eliminated as the act with the fewest public votes.

Week 6: Semi-Final (24/25 November)
24 November
Theme: Get Me to the Final (Part I) & Mamma Mia

This week's semi-final featured a triple elimination. During Saturday's show, the lines froze where the two acts with the fewest votes were immediately eliminated. They then re-opened and closed during Sunday's results show ahead of the final sing-off of the series.

In addition, following all of the act's first performance during Saturday's show, each act performed a segment from an ABBA song where Björn Ulvaeus joined the judging panel for the performances.

25 November
 Theme: Get Me to the Final (Part II)
 Musical guests: Zara Larsson ("Ruin My Life")

Judges' votes to send through to the final
 Cowell: Scarlett Lee – based on the sing-off performances, and said he would have made the same choice even if Scarlett Lee was not his own act; he said without her, the final would not be the same.
 Williams: Acacia & Aaliyah – backed his own act, Acacia & Aaliyah.
 Field: Scarlett Lee – based on the sing-off performances.
 Tomlinson: Scarlett Lee – based on the vocals only in the sing-off performances.

Week 7: Final (1/2 December)

1 December
Theme: No theme; Celebrity duets
Group Performance: "Let Me Entertain You"/"Rock DJ"/"Freedom" (Top 10 contestants with Robbie Williams)
Musical guests: James Arthur & Anne-Marie ("Rewrite the Stars") and George Ezra ("Shotgun")

2 December
Theme: Winners duets
Musical guests: Pinkfong ("Baby Shark"), Ellie Goulding ("Close To Me"), Nile Rodgers & Chic ("Le Freak"/"'Till The World Falls"/"We Are Family"/"I Want Your Love"/"Do You Wanna Party"/"Good Times"/"Rapper's Delight" with Acacia & Aaliyah and Misunderstood) and Take That ("Shine"/"Everything Changes" with Robbie Williams)

Reception

Ratings
As of September 2018, all official ratings include those who watched on demand via the ITV Hub.

 The ratings over a 28-day period, including the broadcasts on ITV and streaming through ITV Hub using BARB's four-screen dashboard system (includes viewers watching on tablets/smartphones).
 The ITV rank for the programme compared to other ITV broadcasts for the week.

Controversies

Accusations of transphobia
During the audition stage, 20-year-old transgender man Felix Shepherd impressed the judges with his rendition of "All I Want" by Kodaline, and received a standing ovation from the crowd. Before singing, Williams asked him about his background; Shepherd said he was there to prove to people that he was "more than just a transgender guy." Williams responded by asking him: "So when you were born, what was your name?", thus misgendering him. Although many fans of the show were supportive of the representation, many were outraged by Williams' question, though Shepherd stated that he was not offended by Williams.

Sharon Osbourne
On 5 September 2018, whilst on Howard Stern's radio show, Osbourne accused Cowell of underpaying her for the new series. She used some offensive language to criticise Cowell and the show's auditionees, which led to a backlash from fans who suggested that Osbourne should be replaced. Osbourne subsequently announced her decision to not participate during the live shows. Various sources reported that Osbourne had been fired over the interview and Stern stated that he believed she had been tipped off to keep quiet. Osbourne later refuted Stern's allegations and stated that her comments were only made in jest and were not to be taken literally, but that they were misappropriated by other people including The X Factor’s production company due to Stern wanting to give Cowell a bad reputation by using his radio show. She added that although the company wanted to fire her, Cowell was not upset with the comments and wanted her to remain on the show, but that it was ultimately her decision to step down out of fear of awkwardness between her and fellow judges Williams and Field, with whom she is close friends, though she did not rule out a return to the show in the future.

Sound problems
During the third week of live shows, sound issues caused the judges, O'Leary and contestants to sound distorted. As the show was not live, O'Leary did not address the sound problems until the following night's live results show, but at the end of the programme, another message said: "Due to a technical issue, tonight's vote has been cancelled. It will open in tomorrow night's show." During the results show all the performances of the night were replayed before the lines opened to make the vote as fair as possible for the contestants.

References

External links

2018 British television seasons
2018 in British music
15
United Kingdom 15